Emanuel M. Abrahams (July 7, 1866, – July 1, 1913) was an American businessman and politician.

Abrahams was born in Chicago, Illinois and was a member of the Jewish religion. He was a merchant in Chicago. Abrahams served in the Illinois House of Representatives from 1907 to 1911 and was a Democrat. He then served on the Chicago City Council until his death. Abrahams died at a hospital in Chicago, Illinois at age 46 after suffering a stroke at the Chicago City Hall.

Notes

External links

1866 births
1913 deaths
Businesspeople from Chicago
Chicago City Council members
Democratic Party members of the Illinois House of Representatives
Jewish American state legislators in Illinois
19th-century American businesspeople